George Szanto (born 1940) is an American-Canadian novelist, playwright, critic, and scholar. His published work includes more than a dozen novels and short-story collections as well as plays, full-length works of literary criticism, mysteries, and a memoir. His work has also appeared in literary periodicals including the Kansas Quarterly, the Bucknell Review, the Massachusetts Review, and the Canadian Comparative Literature Review and in anthologies. He is a fellow of the Royal Society of Canada, and he won the Hugh MacLennan Award for Fiction in 1995 for his novel Friends & Marriages. 

Born in Derry, Northern Ireland, Szanto attended Dartmouth College in the United States, the University of Frankfurt am Main in Germany, and the University of Aix-Marseille in France before completing a Ph.D. at Harvard University in 1967. During his academic career, Szanto taught comparative and dramatic literature at the University of California, San Diego, and comparative literature at McGill University, Montreal, Quebec.

Bibliography

Short story collections
 Sixteen Ways to Skin a Cat (1977)
 Duets (with Per Brask) (1989)

Novels
 Not Working (1982)
 The Underside of Stones: A Story Cycle (1990)
 Friends & Marriages (1994)
 The Condesa of M (2001)
 Second Sight (2004)
 The Tartarus House on Crab
 Whatever Lola Wants (2014)

Mysteries
Four novels, co-authored with Sandy Frances Duncan, comprise the Islands Investigations International Mysteries, as follows:
 Never Sleep with a Suspect on Gabriola Island (2009)
 Always Kiss the Corpse on Whidbey Island (2010)
 Never Hug a Mugger on Quadra Island (2011)
 Always Love a Villain on San Juan Island (2013)

Criticism
 Narrative Consciousness: Structure and Perception in the Fiction of Kafka, Beckett and Robbe-Grillet (1972)
 Theater and Propaganda (1978)
 Narrative Taste and Social Perspectives: The Matter of Quality (1987)
Inside the Statues of Saints: Mexican Writers Talk About Culture and Corruption, Politics and Daily Life

Biography
 Bog Tender: Coming Home to Nature and Memory (2013)

Drama
 The New Black Crook (1971)
 Chinchill! (with Milton Savage) (1972)
 After the Ceremony (1978)
 The Next Move (1981)

Satire
A modest proposition to the people of Canada concerning the pervasive ills and divisions afflicting the nation, including but not limited to the anguish of a land rent asunder by heinous tax bills, curtailment of economic opportunity, the plight of the middle classes, and Quebec (with Per Brask and the Committee Responsible for the Oversight of Canadian Conflict) (1992)

Awards
 Hugh MacLennan Award for Fiction (1995} for Friends & Marriages
 Finalist, The Voices of Canada (1980)
 Finalist, Books in Canada First Novel Award (1984) for Not Working
 Silver Foundation Medal, National Magazine Awards (1988) for "How Ali Cran Got His Name"
 Fellow, Royal Society of Canada (1988)
 ACTRA winner, Southwest Theatre Conference New Play Project for The New Black Crook

References

1940 births
Living people
Canadian male short story writers
Canadian male novelists
20th-century Canadian novelists
21st-century Canadian novelists
Canadian memoirists
20th-century Canadian short story writers
20th-century Canadian male writers
21st-century Canadian male writers
Canadian male non-fiction writers
Dartmouth College alumni
Goethe University Frankfurt alumni
Harvard University alumni
Academic staff of McGill University
University of California, San Diego faculty
Aix-Marseille University alumni
Canadian mystery writers